Advocacy Forum (AF) is a non-profit, non-governmental organization working to promote the rule of law and uphold international human rights standards in Nepal. The organization is part of the Asian Federation Against Involuntary Disappearances.

References

External links
 

Non-profit organisations based in Nepal
Human rights organisations based in Nepal
2001 establishments in Nepal